Santo Trafficante Jr. (November 15, 1914 – March 17, 1987) was among the most powerful Mafia bosses in the United States. He headed the Trafficante crime family from 1954 to 1987 and controlled organized criminal operations in Florida and Cuba, which had previously been consolidated from several rival gangs by his father, Santo Trafficante Sr.

Trafficante maintained links to the Bonanno crime family in New York City, but was more closely allied with Sam Giancana in Chicago. Consequently, while generally recognized as the most powerful organized crime figure in Florida throughout much of the 20th century, Trafficante was not believed to have total control over Miami, Miami Beach, Ft. Lauderdale, or Palm Beach. The east coast of Florida was a loosely knit conglomerate of New York family interests with links to Meyer Lansky, Bugsy Siegel, Angelo Bruno, Carlos Marcello, and Frank Ragano.

Trafficante admitted his anti-Castro activities to the United States House Select Committee on Assassinations in 1978, and vehemently denied allegations that he had knowledge of a plot to assassinate President John F. Kennedy. Federal investigators brought racketeering and conspiracy charges against him in the summer of 1986.

Early life 
Trafficante was born in Tampa, Florida, to Sicilian parents Santo Trafficante Sr. and his wife Maria Giuseppa Cacciatore in 1914. He dropped out of high school before the 10th grade. Trafficante maintained several residences in New York City and Florida. U.S. Treasury Department documents indicate that law enforcement believed Trafficante's legitimate business interests to include several legal casinos in Cuba; a Havana drive-in movie theater; and shares in several restaurants and bars in Trafficante's hometown of Tampa, Florida. He was rumored to be part of a Mafia syndicate which owned many Cuban hotels and casinos. As one of the most powerful mobsters in the US, Trafficante was invited to the Havana Conference in December 1946.

Trafficante was arrested frequently throughout the 1950s on various charges of bribery and of running illegal bolita lotteries in Tampa's Ybor City district. He escaped conviction all but once, receiving a five-year sentence for bribery in 1954, but his conviction was overturned by the Florida Supreme Court before he entered prison.

During the 1950s, Trafficante Jr. maintained a narcotic trafficking network with Tommy Lucchese, the boss of the Lucchese crime family in New York City. Trafficante Jr. had known Lucchese since the 1940s, when his father and Lucchese had trained him in the mafia traditions. Trafficante Jr. would frequently meet with Lucchese in New York City for dinner.

Cuba 

Trafficante had been operating in Cuba since the late 1940s under his father, Santo Trafficante Sr., a mobster in Tampa, Florida. After his father died in 1954, he became the head in Tampa and took over his fathers interests in Cuba. Trafficante moved to Cuba in 1955, where he came into contact with Batista and Meyer Lansky. During the rule of Cuba's authoritarian dictator Fulgencio Batista, Trafficante openly operated the Sans Souci Cabaret and the Casino International gambling establishments in Havana. As a leading member of the syndicate, he also was suspected of having behind-the-scenes interests in other syndicate-owned Cuban casinos: the Hotel Habana Riviera, the Tropicana Club, the Sevilla-Biltmore, the Capri Hotel Casino, the Commodoro, the Deauville, and the Havana Hilton.

Trafficante was apprehended in November 1957, along with over 60 other mobsters, at the Apalachin meeting in Apalachin, New York. All were fined, up to $10,000 each, and given prison sentences ranging from three to five years. All the convictions were overturned on appeal in 1960. Cuba was one of the Apalachin topics of discussion, particularly the gambling and narcotics smuggling interests of La Cosa Nostra on the island. The international narcotics trade was also an important topic on the Apalachin agenda.

In January 1958, Trafficante was questioned by the Cuban police regarding the Apalachin meeting. A full report was made by the Cuban police, dated January 23, 1958, includes transcripts of long-distance telephone calls made from the Sans Souci during the period August–December 1957. The report was given to the District Attorney's office. In addition, "on January 23, 1958 the Cuban Department of Investigation, Havana, Cuba notified the Bureau of Narcotics that Santo Trafficante was registered in their Alien Office under No. 93461."

Plot to assassinate Castro
After Fidel Castro's revolutionary government seized the assets of Trafficante's Cuban businesses and expelled him from the country as an "undesirable alien," Trafficante came into contact with various US intelligence operatives, and was involved in several unsuccessful plans to assassinate Castro. In 1975, the CIA declassified a report stating that Trafficante had been persuaded to poison Castro, an allegation he denied. In 1997, further declassified documents indicated that some mafiosi worked with the agency on assassination attempts against Castro. Allusions to these historic connections were confirmed by the CIA's 2007 declassification of the "Family Jewels" documents.

The "Family Jewels" confirmed that in September 1960, the CIA recruited ex-FBI agent Robert Maheu to approach the West Coast representative of the Chicago mob, Johnny Roselli. Maheu hid the fact that he was sent by the CIA, instead portraying himself an advocate for international corporations. He offered to pay $150,000 to have Castro killed, but Roselli declined any pay and introduced Maheu to two men he referred to as "Sam Gold" and "Joe." "Sam Gold" was Sam Giancana; "Joe" was Trafficante. The CIA and the Mafia had a common enemy in Castro, a communist revolutionary who had shut down Cuba's lucrative casino businesses.

JFK conspiracy allegations
In 1976, Cuban exile and FBI informant Jose Aleman told The Washington Post that in September 1962, Trafficante had offered him a loan of $1.5 million to replace Aleman's three-story "ramshackle motel with a 12-story glass wonder." He said that Trafficante complained about the honesty of the Kennedys and their "attacks" on Jimmy Hoffa and other associates. According to Aleman, when he told Trafficante that President John F. Kennedy would likely be re-elected, Trafficante replied, "No, Jose, he is going to be hit." Aleman claimed to have reported Trafficante's comments to his FBI contacts, who "dismissed the Kennedy warnings as gangland braggadocio."

In 1978, both Trafficante and Aleman were called to testify before members of the United States House Select Committee on Assassinations investigating possible links between Kennedy assassin Lee Harvey Oswald and anti-Castro Cubans, including the theory that Castro had Kennedy killed in retaliation for the CIA's attempts on his own life. On September 27, 1978, Aleman reiterated to HSCA investigators that Trafficante had complained to him for hours in June or July 1963 about Kennedy's crackdown on organized crime at a meeting to discuss a business loan.

The HSCA had previously quoted Aleman as stating that he thought Trafficante's use of the phrase "he is going to be hit" meant that the mob boss knew Kennedy was going to be killed. When this was pointed out, Aleman denied that he meant that he believed Kennedy was going to murdered and said he thought that Trafficante meant that Kennedy was going to be "hit" politically during the next election. He stated that he was concerned for his safety and was not certain that he had ever correctly heard or understood Trafficante's comment.

After a grant of immunity from prosecution, Trafficante testified before the HSCA the following day, September 28, and denied the allegation that he told Aleman that "Kennedy was going to be hit." He stated that he was positive that he did not say it because he always spoke to Aleman in Spanish, and said that there was no way to state the phrase in Spanish. Trafficante also stated that he had no recollection of meeting Oswald or Oswald's assassin, Jack Ruby. During his testimony, Trafficante also admitted for the first time that he had worked with the CIA from 1960 to 1961 for an attempt to poison Castro but stated that his role was only as an interpreter between CIA officials and Cuban exiles. He testified that he was brought into the plot by Roselli and Giancana, who had been recruited by Maheu. Trafficante said that he introduced the trio to Cuban exiles in Florida. He stated that he received no payment for his involvement and that he acted out of patriotism.

On January 14, 1992, Trafficante's former attorney, Frank Ragano, told Jack Newfield of the New York Post that he relayed a request from Hoffa to Trafficante and New Orleans boss Carlos Marcello to have Kennedy killed. He repeated the claim two days later on ABC's Good Morning America, in Newfield's Frontline report entitled JFK, Hoffa and Mob broadcast in November 1992, and again in his 1994 autobiography Mob Lawyer. According to Ragano, he met Hoffa at the Teamsters' headquarters in Washington, DC, then delivered the message to Trafficante and Marcello in a meeting at the Royal Orleans Hotel in New Orleans. He stated he was chosen by Hoffa because, as both Hoffa and Trafficante's lawyer, he could be assured of attorney–client privilege.

Ragano also claimed that Trafficante, four days prior to his death, delivered a deathbed confession which suggested that Marcello was meant to assassinate Robert F. Kennedy instead of his brother, the President. He claimed three witnesses could support his statement that he met Trafficante in Tampa, but refused to name them, adding: "One guy is afraid of retaliation. The other guys are two doctors, who say they'll testify if they're summoned to court." In his book Reclaiming History: The Assassination of President John F. Kennedy, Vincent Bugliosi has claimed there to be many flaws in Ragano's claims, including his own claim that Trafficante was most likely not in Tampa on the day in question, but was rather in North Miami Beach, Florida, receiving dialysis treatments.

In 2005, Lamar Waldron and Thom Hartmann's book Ultimate Sacrifice said that Trafficante was behind an aborted plot to kill Kennedy in Tampa on November 18, 1963.

Later years and death 
Trafficante was summoned to court in 1986 and questioned about his involvement with the King's Court Bottle Club operated by members of the Bonanno crime family, including undercover FBI agent Joseph D. "Joe" Pistone, a.k.a. Donnie Brasco. Trafficante again escaped conviction. On March 17, 1987, Trafficante died at the age of 72 at the Texas Heart Institute in Houston where he had gone for heart surgery. His wife, Josephine, died in 2015 at the age of 95; he is survived by two of his daughters. After the death of his wife, the Trafficante family sold their Tampa 1970-built home for $950,000. In February 2016, many of Trafficante's personal belongings were sold at an auction in St. Petersburg, Florida.

References

Further reading 
Cigar City Mafia : A Complete History of the Tampa Underworld (2004), Scott M. Deitche,  Barricade Books 
The Silent Don: The Criminal Underworld of Santo Trafficante Jr (2007), Scott M. Deitche,  Barricade Books 
Mob Lawyer (1996), Frank Ragano, Random House 
"White Shadow", (2006) Ace Atkins, (G.P. Putnam) 
Donnie Brasco: My Undercover Life in the Mafia. Joseph D. Pistone(1987)

External links 
Associated Press report on Trafficante's death 
Short history of the Mafia in Tampa
"Little Man: Meyer Lansky and the Gangster Life" By Robert Lacy

1914 births
1987 deaths
Trafficante crime family
American gangsters of Sicilian descent
People from Tampa, Florida
American crime bosses